HD 106248, also known as HR 4649, is a solitary, orange hued star located in the southern circumpolar constellation Chamaeleon. It has an apparent magnitude of 6.34, placing it near the limit for naked eye visibility. Based on parallax measurements from Gaia DR3, the object is estimated to be 358 light years away from the Solar System. At its current distance, HD 106248's brightness is diminished by 0.32 due to interstellar dust and Eggen (1993) lists it as a member of the old (thick) disk population.

This is an evolved red giant with a stellar classification of K2/3 III CNII—intermediate between a K2 and K3 giant star. The CNII suffix indicates that it has a strong overabundance of cyano radicals in its spectrum, making it a CN star. It has 119% the mass of the Sun and is estimated to be 4.31 billion years old, slightly younger than the Sun.

References

CN stars
K-type giants
106248
059647
4649
Chamaeleon (constellation)
CD-77 00542
Chamaeleontis, 39